Presley Thornton Glass (October 18, 1824 – October 9, 1902) was an American politician and a member of the United States House of Representatives for the 9th congressional district of Tennessee.

Biography
Glass was born on October 18, 1824 in Houston, Virginia in Halifax County son of Dudley and Nancy Carr Glass. In 1828, he moved with his parents to Weakley County, Tennessee where he attended Dresden Academy. He was elected colonel of militia when he was eighteen years of age. He studied law, attended one course at Lexington (Kentucky) Law School. He married Sarah C. Partee on December 20, 1848. They had two children, Hiram D. and James Nelson.

Career
Glass was admitted to the bar in 1847 and commenced practice in Ripley, Tennessee. He served in the Tennessee House of Representatives in 1848 and again in 1882.

During the Civil War, Glass served as commissary with the rank of major in the Confederate service.

Elected as a Democrat to the Forty-ninth and Fiftieth Congresses, Glass served from March 4, 1885 to March 3, 1889.  He was an unsuccessful candidate for renomination in 1888.

Death
Glass died in Ripley, Tennessee on October 9, 1902 (77 years, 356 days). He is interred at Maplewood Cemetery.

References

External links

Democratic Party members of the Tennessee House of Representatives
1824 births
1902 deaths
Democratic Party members of the United States House of Representatives from Tennessee
19th-century American politicians
People from Halifax, Virginia
People from Ripley, Tennessee